Deakin University is a public university in Victoria, Australia. Founded in 1974, the university was named after Alfred Deakin, the second Prime Minister of Australia.

Its main campuses are in Melbourne's Burwood suburb, Geelong Waurn Ponds, Geelong Waterfront and Warrnambool, as well as the online Cloud Campus. Deakin also has learning centres in Dandenong and Werribee, all in the state of Victoria.

As of 2021, Deakin University is ranked among the top 1% of universities in the world, is ranked one of the top 26 young universities in the world, is the 3rd highest ranked university in the world for Sport Science, is one of the top 29 universities in the world for Nursing, is one of the top 32 universities in the world for Education, and is among fewer than 5% of Business Schools worldwide with Association to Advance Collegiate Schools of Business accreditation.

Deakin's research activities are growing. 100% of Deakin research was rated at
or above world standard in the 2018 Excellence in Research Australia (ERA) ratings. Its combined research funding increased from A$4.5 million in 1997 to A$47.2 million in 2015. In 2020, the university's research income was $87.6 million, with 247 Higher degree by Research completions.

Deakin University consistently ranks highly in undergraduate student satisfaction; in the 2019 Student Experience Survey, Deakin had the fourth highest student satisfaction rating nationally, the highest student satisfaction rating out of all Australian public universities and the highest student satisfaction rating out of all Victorian universities. Deakin has had the highest undergraduate student satisfaction ratings out of all Victorian universities every year since 2010 and has consistently placed in the top two for highest postgraduate student satisfaction out of all Victorian universities every year since 2010.

History
Deakin University was formally established in 1974 with the passage of the Deakin University Act 1974. Deakin was Victoria's fourth university, the first to be established in regional Victoria and the first to specialise in distance education.

Deakin University's first campus was established at Waurn Ponds. The university was the result of a merger between State College of Victoria, Geelong (formerly Geelong Teachers College) and the higher education courses of  the Gordon Institute of Technology. Deakin enrolled its first students at Waurn Ponds in 1977.

The Burwood campus is on the site of the former Burwood Teachers' College, and also takes in the former sites of the Bennettswood Primary School and the Burwood Secondary School. The teachers' college conducted two-year training courses for Primary School teachers, and three year courses for Infant Teachers (females only). It provided live-on-site accommodation for country students.

As part of the Dawkins education reforms that were announced in 1988 by the Commonwealth government, a merger with Warrnambool Institute of Advanced Education took place in 1990, which was followed by a merger with most of Victoria College in 1991, with its campuses in Burwood, Rusden and Toorak.

The Rusden Campus was closed in 2003 and all courses were transferred to the Melbourne Burwood campus. Rusden was subsequently acquired by Monash University for its student accommodation purposes.

The former Toorak Campus, located in Malvern, was offered for sale in 2006 as the university considered the campus surplus to its requirements.  The courses and resources were relocated to the Melbourne Burwood campus in November 2007.  As a Deakin campus, it was home to the Deakin Business School, Deakin University English Language Institute (DUELI), and the Melbourne Institute of Business and Technology, which have since relocated to the International Centre and Business Building at the Melbourne Burwood campus..

The main building on the site was  the 116-year-old historic Stonnington Mansion  The sale of Stonnington Mansion by Deakin provoked public outrage as it involved the mansion which was at risk of redevelopment by property developers. The Stonnington Stables art gallery and the university's contemporary art collection were located here, but has since relocated to the Deakin University Art Gallery at the Melbourne Burwood campus.  The university's action of offering the campus, including the mansion, provoked public outrage over the potential privatization of what had been public space.  In December 2006, the three-mansion was sold for $33 million to a joint venture between Hamton Property Group and Industry Superannuation Property Trust.

List of antecedent institutions
Antecedent institutions with records held by the university library include:

 Warrnambool Institute of Advanced Education
 Geelong Teachers’ College
 The Gordon Institute
 Victoria College
 Burwood Teachers’ College
 Burwood State College
 Glendonald
 Glenbervie
 Toorak Teachers’ College
 Toorak State College
 Mercer House (first Associated Teachers' Training Institution, or ATTI, later absorbed into Toorak Teachers College)
 Monash Teachers’ College
 Rusden State College
 Prahran Technical School
 Prahran College of Advanced Education

Governance
The Deakin University Council is the governing body of the university and is chaired by the chancellor, John Stanhope AM. The council is responsible for the general direction and oversight of the university and is publicly accountable for the university's actions.The vice-chancellor is the chief executive officer of the university and is responsible to the council. Professor Iain Martin is vice-chancellor and president of Deakin University and is Deakin's 7th vice-chancellor.

Vice-Chancellors
 1977–1985 – Frederic Jevons
 1986–1991 – Malcolm Skilbeck
 1992–1996 – John A. Hay
 1997–2002 – Geoff Wilson
 2003–2010 – Sally Walker
 2010–2019 – Jane den Hollander
2019–Present – Iain Martin

Organisational structure
The university is divided into four faculties, covering arts and education, business and law, health, and science, engineering and built environment. Within the Faculty of Arts and Education the three schools cover education, social sciences, humanities, communication and the creative arts. The Institute of Koorie Education also falls under the Faculty of Arts and Education. The Faculty of Health has the School of Medicine, along with schools covering nursing and midwifery, exercise and nutrition sciences, psychology, and incorporates subjects such as occupational therapy, social work, and health economics into the School of Health and Social Development. The Deakin University School of Law and the Deakin Business School both fall under the Faculty of Business and Law, and the Faculty of Science, Engineering and Built Environment encompasses architecture, information technology, engineering, and life and environmental sciences.

Research

The university has seven research institutes:
Alfred Deakin Institute for Citizenship and Globalisation (ADI);
Applied Artificial Intelligence Institute (A²I²);
Institute for Frontier Materials (IFM);
Institute for Health Transformation (IHT);
Institute for Intelligent Systems Research and Innovation (IISRI);
Institute for Mental and Physical Health and Clinical Translation (IMPACT); and the
Institute for Physical Activity and Nutrition (IPAN).
 
There are also 6 Strategic Research and Innovation Centres (SRICs):
 Centre for Integrative Ecology (CIE);
 Centre for Cyber Security Research and Innovation (CSRI);
 Centre for Social and Early Emotional Development (SEED);
 Centre for Regional and Rural Futures (CeRRF);
 Centre for Sports Research (CSR); and
 Research for Educational Impact (REDI).

Australian Campuses

Melbourne Burwood Campus 

The university's largest campus is in Burwood  about 45 minutes by tram (route 75) from the Melbourne CBD. Located alongside Gardiner's Creek parklands between Elgar Road on the north-west border and Mount Scopus Memorial College on the east border. The campus has around 31,975 (2020) undergraduate and postgraduate on-campus students.

Waurn Ponds Campus 

The original campus of Deakin University  is located in the regional city of Geelong in the suburb of Waurn Ponds, 72 kilometres south west of Melbourne. The campus, serviced by the Princes Highway and the Geelong Ring Road. It has a student population of more than 8,382 (2020).

The campus is home to the Geelong Technology Precinct, which provides research and development capabilities and opportunities for university–industry partnerships and new enterprises in the region. The Elite Sports Precinct is used as an alternate training facility by the Geelong Football Club.

The Waurn Ponds Deakin Residence houses 800 students in shared dorms, shared units, town houses and studio apartments.

The residence is made up of Alfred Deakin College, Barton College, and Parkes College.

The Deakin Medical School opened in 2008 and is the first rural and regional medical school in Victoria. Deakin's Bachelor of Medicine Bachelor of Surgery MBBS is a four-year, graduate-entry program which prepares students for practice in a range of health care settings.

Warrnambool Campus 
The Warrnambool Campus  was created in 1990 when the university absorbed the Warrnambool Institute of Advanced Education. It is situated on the banks of the Hopkins River in the coastal city of Warrnambool, close to local surf beaches and popular tourist attractions in close proximity to the Great Ocean Road and The Twelve Apostles.

There is an on-campus student population of more than 520 (2020) pursuing courses in arts, business, education, environment, health sciences, law, management, marine biology, nursing and psychology.

Geelong Waterfront Campus 

The Geelong Waterfront Campus  is Deakin's newest campus, located on Corio Bay, in the central business district of Geelong. Originally built as the Dalgety's Woolstores in 1893, the buildings have been extensively renovated.

More than 5,362 (2020) students are based at the Geelong Waterfront Campus, which hosts the schools of Architecture and Built Environment, Health and Social Development, Psychology, and Nursing and Midwifery, as well as the Faculty of Business and Law.

A $37 million redevelopment of the Dennys Lascelles Building has increased the capacity of this campus, allowing the university to provide an expanded range of courses. The building houses the Alfred Deakin Prime Ministerial Library and the Alfred Deakin Institute.

This campus houses Costa Hall, a 1422-seat concert auditorium, which is used for the university's graduation ceremonies and is part of Geelong Arts Centre.

International Campuses

Gift City (India) Campus 
Deakin University is establishing a campus in India's GIFT City that will initially provide cybersecurity and business analytics courses. The institution will be the first tertiary varsity to gain the Indian government's approval to set up a campus in India.

Schools and divisions 

 Deakin Business School
 Deakin Law School
 Deakin University School of medicine
 School of Nursing and Midwifery
 School of Architecture and Built Environment
 School of Engineering
 School of Information Technology
 School of Life and Environmental Sciences
 School of Communication and Creative Arts
 School of Education
 School of Humanities and Social Sciences
 Deakin University English Language Institute

Deakin University Student Association
The Deakin University Student Association (DUSA) is the dominant student representative organisation operating across all campuses and courses. As well as representation, DUSA provides a range of services and benefits to members, and coordinates all other clubs and societies operating on campus. There is a wide range of groups/clubs for students to join and these groups vary from campus to campus. DUSA is also made up of student representatives who are elected by Deakin University students, with the current president of DUSA being Georgie Brimer. DUSA is affiliated at a national level to the National Union of Students.

Research
Deakin is one of Australia's fastest-growing research universities. Its combined research funding had increased from A$4.5 million in 1997 to A$47.2 million in 2015. 100% of Deakin research was rated at or above world standard in the 2018 ERA ratings, a quality evaluation of all research produced in Australian universities.

In 2018, the Australian Research Council awarded Deakin University $8.42 million in funding for 23 new research projects in its 2019 funding announcement. This included 15 Discovery Projects and 8 Discovery Early Career Researcher Award (DECRA) projects, six of which were from the university's Faculty of Arts and Education.

The Australian Research Council awarded Deakin University 5 Linkage Projects in the 2016 ARC Linkage Programme rounds, and 3 Linkage Grants in its 2013 allocations. In its 2010 allocations, the Australian Research Council awarded Deakin 13 Discovery and 10 Linkage Round 1 awards. Deakin was also one of only six universities to be awarded funding for an ITTC, and received 100% of the amount requested.

The Alfred Deakin Prime Ministerial Library is named after the early Australian Prime Minister and statesman, Alfred Deakin (1856–1919), and provides opportunities for research and learning.

Researchers at Deakin University developed the Motorcycle Clothing Assessment Program (MotoCAP) used by Australian and New Zealand government and related organisations. In 2019, it won the Fédération Internationale de Motocyclisme road safety award.

Rankings

In 2020, the Times Higher Education 100 Under 50 ranked Deakin University 55th in the World among the top Universities under 50 years old; Deakin was ranked 10th in Australia and 1st in Victoria under this category. In 2020, the QS Top 50 Under 50 (universities which are under 50 years old) ranked Deakin University 26th in the World among the top Universities under 50 years old; Deakin was ranked 6th in Australia and 2nd in Victoria under this category.

In 2009, 2013 and 2015 the Graduate Management Association of Australia (GMAA) awarded Deakin's Master of Business Administration and Master of Business Administration (International) courses the maximum score of five stars, placing them in the top rank of Australia's MBA courses. In 2018, and 2020, Deakin's Master of Business Administration was ranked amongst the world's top 200 by Quacquarelli Symonds.

Since 2016, Deakin has been ranked in the top 2% of the world's universities in the Shanghai Ranking's Academic Ranking of World Universities (ARWU), Times Higher Education and QS World University Rankings.

Deakin ranks 3rd in Victoria, 15 in Australia, 16 in Oceania, and 272 in the world in the Webometrics Ranking of World Universities.

Student well-being

Reports of on-campus sexual assault and harassment
Between 2011 and 2016 the university reported there were 40 officially cases of sexual abuse and harassment on campus, resulting in 12 staff members being disciplined or sacked for sexual misconduct and no student expulsions or suspensions. The 2017 Australian Human Rights Commission report on sexual assault and harassment surveyed 649 Deakin students, and reported somewhat higher figures than this, finding that 2.8% of those surveyed claimed to have been assaulted on campus, and 21% had been sexually harassed.

Notable alumni

 Emma Alberici, journalist/presenter with the ABC
 Phillip Aspinall, Primate of the Anglican Church in Australia: MBA
 Julie Attwood,  Member of Legislative Assembly of Queensland
 Jimmy Bartel, 2007 Brownlow Medallist and triple AFL Premiership Player in 2007, 2009 and 2011 with the Geelong Football Club. 2011 Norm Smith medallist
 Mark Blake, 2009 AFL Premiership player with the Geelong Football Club
 Campbell Brown, 2008 AFL Premiership player with Hawthorn Football Club and inaugural Gold Coast Football Club player: BCom (Sports Management)
 John Brumby, former Premier of Victoria: Dip Ed
 Mark Butler MP, Federal Member for Port Adelaide
 Tim Callan, AFL footballer with the Western Bulldogs: BCom
 Briony Cole, Gold medalist, 2006 Commonwealth Games, & Silver medalist, 2008 Summer Olympics
 Neil Comrie, former Chief Commissioner of Victoria Police: BA (Police Studies)
 Rodger Corser, Australian actor: BA (Hons) (Media Studies)
 Adinda Cresheilla, Indonesian G20 Ambassador, actress, fashion model, Puteri Indonesia Pariwisata 2022, Miss Supranational Indonesia 2022 and 3rd Runner-up of Miss Supranational 2022 beauty pageant: BA in Communication
 Trish Crossin, Senator for Northern Territory
 Peter Daniel, former footballer for Essendon Football Club, AFL: DipTeach
 Colonel Benito Antonio Templo De-León, Military Officer, Philippine Army: MA (Strategic Studies)
 Tony Ellwood, Director of the National Gallery of Victoria and former director of Queensland Art Gallery and Gallery of Modern Art, Glasgow: M.App.Sc.(Museum Studies)
 Oliver Feltham, contemporary philosopher and English translator of Alain Badiou's Being and Event (2006)
 Simon Garlick, CEO of the Western Bulldogs: BExSc
 Ben Graham, former Geelong Football Club star, now a punter for the Arizona Cardinals of the National Football League; first Australian to play in the Super Bowl: BCom
 Peter Gutwein, Premier of Tasmania: DipFP, GradCertBusAdmin
 Carolyn Hardy, CEO UNICEF Australia: BA, MA
 Tom Harley, Dual Premiership Captain of Geelong Football Club in 2007 and 2009: BCom
 Geoff Hunt, World Champion squash player: Charles William apeGrad Dip (Nutrition)
 Major General Mark Kelly, Officer of the Australian Army: Grad.Dip. Defence Studies
 Arthur Vivian Lucas Jones, Bishop of the Anglican Church in Australia
 James Kilgore, as Charles William Pape, member of the Symbionese Liberation Army: PhD
 Michael Klinger, Australian cricketer
 Christopher Lynch, former Chief Financial Officer & Former Director of BHP, CEO of Transurban: BCom, MBA
 Mat McBriar, punter for the Dallas Cowboys of the National Football League
 Bridget McKenzie, Senator for Victoria, former Deputy Leader of the National Party of Australia
 Michael Malouf, former Chief Executive Officer, Carlton Football Club: MBA
 Carmen Marton, Australia's first ever world taekwondo champion
 Lindsay Maxsted, Chairman Westpac
 Denis Napthine, Premier of Victoria: MBA
 Livinia Nixon, Nine Network weather presenter: BCom, BA
 Henry Playfair, AFL footballer with the Sydney Swans: BCom
 Nitya Prakash, Bestselling Author
 Isabella Rositano, rapper and multi-sport athlete 
 Jeff Rowley, surfer and celebrity speaker: MBA in leadership and communications.
 Mahmoud Saikal, Permanent representative of Afghanistan to the United Nations  
 Leigh Sales, ABC journalist, anchor of 7.30 and book writer: Master of International Relations, Brisbane Writers Festival.
 Anurag Singh (director), Pollywood and Bollywood director
 Tommy Smith, international racing driver
 Matt Stevic, AFL umpire
 Jim Stynes OAM, businessman and Chairman of Melbourne Football Club: BEd
 Diana Taylor Prominent Businesswoman
 Nathan Templeton, former 10 News First sports reporter and now the Melbourne correspondent on Sunrise
 Stella Young, comedian, journalist and disability rights activist: BA
 Mandawuy Yunupingu, indigenous musician, community leader and  Australian of the Year (1992): BA
 Mohammad Tawih, commander of the Royal Brunei Armed Forces: MA (Strategic Studies)

Notable faculty
Anurag Singh (director), filmmaker
Kevin Anderson, filmmaker
Kate Buchanan ARC Future Fellow
Tania de Koning-Ward, Commonwealth Health Minister's Medal for Excellence in Health and Medical Research
Peter Hodgson, 2009 Australian Laureate Fellow
John Jonas, Birks Professor of Metallurgy, McGill University: Visiting Professor.
Caryl Nowson, Chair in Nutrition and Ageing
Ross Oakley, former Australian Football League CEO: Adjunct Professor in the Faculty of Business and Law
David Parkin, former coach of Carlton and Hawthorn Football Clubs: Lecturer in Exercise Science.
Mark Weinberg, Chief Justice of Norfolk Island: Adjunct Professor, School of Law.
Jim Kennan, former politician, Adjunct Professor of Law
Svetha Venkatesh, Director of the Centre for Pattern Recognition and Data Analytics
Jodi McAlister, Australian author and Senior Lecturer

Notable associates

 Frank Costa Businessman and Philanthropist
 Lindsay Fox Businessman and Philanthropist
 Brett Lee Australian Cricketer and Deakin India Research Institute (DIRI) associate
 Denis Napthine Victorian Premier and Politician
 Jeff Rowley Big Wave Surfer, Adventure Waterman, and Celebrity Speaker

References

External links
Official website

 
Educational institutions established in 1974
Education in Geelong
Universities in Victoria (Australia)
Universities in Melbourne
Education in Warrnambool
1974 establishments in Australia